The 2004–05 B Group was the 50th season of the Bulgarian B Football Group, the second tier of the Bulgarian football league system. A total of 16 teams contested the league.

League table

Top scorers

References

External links 
 2004–05 Bulgarian B Group season

2003-04
Bul
2